Hajji Eynak (also Romanized as Ḩājjī ‘Eynak and Ḩājjī Īnak; also known as Āqbolāgh) is a village in Anguran Rural District, Anguran District, Mahneshan County, Zanjan Province, Iran. At the 2006 census, its population was 25, in 5 families.

References 

Populated places in Mahneshan County